The 1972 U.S. Figure Skating Championships was held from January 13–16 at the Long Beach Arena in Long Beach, California. Medals were awarded in three colors: gold (first), silver (second), and bronze (third) in four disciplines – men's singles, ladies' singles, pair skating, and ice dancing – across three levels: senior, junior, and novice.

The event determined the U.S. teams for the 1972 Winter Olympics and 1972 World Championships.

The 1972 Championships marked the introduction of a significant innovation: the use of a computer to calculate the competition results for the first time at the U.S. Championships. The initial version of the scoring software, called "Hal", was written by volunteer Al Beard in FORTRAN, and ran via a remote terminal link on a time-sharing system donated by Honeywell in Minneapolis, where Beard was employed. Although the computer results were used for public announcements of the results, the rules of the time actually required hand computation of the official results, so this was done after the fact.

Senior results

Men
The men's competition saw something of an upset as defending champion John Misha Petkevich had a poor free skating, missing both his triple salchow and triple loop jumps. Kenneth Shelley, on the other hand, had one of the best performances of his career, allowing him to take the title with the first-place votes of 4 of the 7 judges. He became the first skater to win national titles in both senior men and pairs since 1941, and the first in postwar history to qualify for the Winter Olympics in two disciplines.

Ladies
In compulsory figures, Julie Lynn Holmes took the lead over Janet Lynn. But Lynn easily won the free skating with a faultless performance while Holmes skated cautiously. Second place in the free skating went to Dorothy Hamill, who probably performed the most difficult program but nonetheless could not overcome her deficit in the figures to reach the podium. Suna Murray captured the bronze medal.

Pairs
The previous years' champions JoJo Starbuck / Kenneth Shelley easily defended their title without serious challenge. The pairs competition this year was notable for the new and innovative lifts performed by the second-place team Melissa Militano / Mark Militano as well as by Starbuck / Shelley. The Militanos also included a throw double axel and side-by-side double axels in their program, elements that only a few top pairs in the world were attempting in this era, but they could not match the speed and unison of the champions.

Ice dancing (Gold dance)
The previous years' champions Judy Schwomeyer / Jim Sladky easily defended their title without serious challenge.

Junior results

Men

Ladies

Pairs

Ice dancing (Silver dance)

* Eliminated before final round

Novice results

Men

Ladies

References

Sources
 "Nationals", Skating magazine, Mar 1972

U.S. Figure Skating Championships
United States Figure Skating Championships, 1972
United States Figure Skating Championships, 1972
US Figure Skating Championships
US Figure Skating Championships